Burst was a Swedish progressive metal band from Kristinehamn, active between 1993 and 2009. They were formed in 1993 by Jesper Liveröd, Linus Jägerskog and Patrik Hultin, with guitarists Robert Reinholdz and Jonas Rydberg joining later. Their label, Relapse Records, labelled them one of Sweden's brightest metal prospects.

The band was known to add progressive elements to their metal music making them different from most of the other metalcore bands. Their vocals were a mixture of melodic vocals (Reinholdz) and screaming (Jägerskog). They were last signed to Relapse Records.

Burst were formed by a couple of friends for no real intention but to just make fast-paced, heavy music. They were initially called Dislars. Their older music was more grindcore and crust punk oriented. They played a few live shows across Sweden. They later started playing a brutal style of hardcore punk. The more they improved their playing skills, the band shifted towards a more progressive style while still sticking to their hardcore roots. They later decided on the name Burst. The band then began to take their music more seriously and decided to record demos. During this period they toured heavily.

In 2003, Prey On Life was released through the better-known label Relapse Records. This album set the band's style and garnered them more popularity. Relapse had in its roster bands like Nile and Mastodon, as well as many well-known bands in the metal community. The release was generally well received. By touring with Dillinger Escape Plan, Mastodon and other bands, Burst began to slowly rise in popularity. Before writing their new album, they knew what direction they had to go. Instead of sticking to a formula that worked, they intended to push themselves even further. The result was Origo, which was praised by magazines such as Terrorizer, Metal Hammer and Kerrang! and saw the band becoming more popular than ever before.

Burst's last record, Lazarus Bird, was recorded at Bohussound Studio in Kungälv, Sweden, and produced by Burst and Fredrik Reinedahl, and released by  Relapse Records in September 2008. In July 2009, Burst announced they planned to break up as band after a US tour later that year.

Last active lineup 
 Linus Jägerskog – vocals
 Robert Reinholdz – guitar and vocals
 Jonas Rydberg – guitar
 Jesper Liveröd – bass (ex-Nasum)
 Patrik Hultin – drums

Past members 
 Niklas Lundgren – guitar (1993–1997)
 Ronnie Källback – additional vocals (1993–1996)
 Mats Johansson – guitar (1997–1999)

Discography

Albums
 Two Faced (1998)
 Conquest : Writhe (2000)
 Prey on Life (2003)
 Origo (2005)
 Lazarus Bird (2008)

EPs and split albums
 Burst (1995)
 Shadowcaster (1996)
 Forsaken, Not Forgotten (split with Lash Out) (1998)
 In Coveting Ways (2002)
 Burnt by the Sun / Burst split (2003)
 Burst / The Ocean split (2005)

See also
List of post-metal bands

References

External links 
 Official site
  Interview with Robert Reinholdz

Swedish metalcore musical groups
Post-metal musical groups
Relapse Records artists
Swedish progressive metal musical groups
Musical groups established in 1993
Musical groups disestablished in 2009
Musical quintets
1993 establishments in Sweden